The Internet in Turkey has been available to the public since 1993, although experimentation at Ege University started in 1987. The first available connections were dial-up. Cable Internet has been available since 1998 and ADSL since 2001.

Currently Türk Telekom's TTNET ADSL2+ service is the most widely used Internet service in Turkey, offering speeds from 8 Mbit/s to 24 Mbit/s. TTNET offers VDSL2 service with speeds at 25 Mbit/s to 100 Mbit/s as well. Alternative broadband companies, while mostly still using TTNET infrastructure, such as SmileADSL and TurkNet are also available. Superonline is offering fibre broadband in limited areas in 19 cities, though the company is enlarging at a healthy pace. They currently offer up to 1000 Mbit/s speeds. Furthermore, relatively wide but not universal coverage of cable Internet is maintained by Kablonet, offering speeds from 10 Mbit/s to 100 Mbit/s.

TTNET's monopoly and perceived excessive pricing have received numerous criticisms from users over the years.

According to TÜSİAD, Turkey has 36 million active Internet users with 10 million active e-commerce users. The penetration and the usage of credit cards are very high in Turkey. However development of alternative payment systems will be helpful both by facilitating the shopping of the consumers owning credit cards and by familiarizing non-credit card holders with the e-commerce. In 2019 it was reported that the Internet users of Turkey had reached to 69,107,183 (12th highest number of internet users worldwide) - amounting to 88% of Turkish households having internet access. Wi-Fi in Turkey is free in all areas and easily accessible to all the citizens. Hotels, hostel, railway stations, airports have free access to internet and Wi-Fi.

Turkey implements protectionist policies to stimulate the local internet technology industry and enforce data retention: In 2016 payment gateway PayPal was forced to cease most of its operations in the country. In January 2017 the government unveiled plans to build a domestic web search engine and webmail service.

Internet Entrepreneurship in Turkey, also called "Digital Bosphorus" has reached several exits in last years. The biggest three of them have been Yemeksepeti, Gittigidiyor and Markafoni. According to Sina Afra, the potential of the Turkish Internet market is bigger than in many other European countries.

Internet in Turkey holds a 'Not Free' ranking in Freedom House's index. Turkish government has constantly blocked websites like Facebook, Twitter, YouTube and as of May 2017, Wikipedia was inaccessible According to Twitter's transparency report, Turkey leads in social media censorship. till 15 January 2020; Wikipedia opened to access after the Constitutional Court of Turkey ruled that the block of Wikipedia violated human rights and ordered it to be lifted on 26 December 2019.

Censorship
According to the EngelliWeb Report of the Freedom of Expression Association (İfade Özgürlüğü Derneği) entitled Fahrenheit 5651: The Scorching Effect of Censorship, by the end of 2020, Turkey had blocked access to more than 467.000 websites. 409.000 orders issued by 764 different institutions, including criminal judgeships of peace and other authorized public institutions.

See also
 Censorship in Turkey
 Internet regulation in Turkey
List of countries by number of Internet users Turkey, 15th
Languages used on the Internet Turkish, 3rd
List of countries by number of broadband Internet subscriptions Turkey, 15th
List of countries by number of Internet hosts Turkey, 16th
List of countries by Internet connection speeds Turkey, 63rd & 43rd
List of countries by IPv4 address allocation Turkey, 24th
Carna botnet Turkey, 19th
Web Index Turkey, 38th

References

External links